The dhalang or dalang is the puppeteer in an Indonesian wayang performance.

In a performance of wayang kulit, the dalang sits behind a screen (kelir) made of white cotton stretched on a wooden frame. Above his head, hanging from beams attached to the top of the screen, is the lamp (blencong), which projects the shadows onto the screen. In front of the dhalang is a stage (debog), traditionally made from the trunk of a banana tree, into which the sharpened control rods of the puppets can be pushed to keep them in position during the performance. To his left is the puppet chest (kotak), and to his right is the puppet chest's lid, on which the puppets sit ready for use.

In addition to moving the puppets and speaking their lines, the dalang is also responsible for giving cues to the gamelan. This is done principally by playing the kepyak, a metal plate or set of plates played with his foot, or by rapping on the puppet chest (kotak) with a wooden mallet held in the left hand.

The art of puppetry (pedhalangan) was traditionally handed down within families, and dalangs formed a type of informal caste within Javanese society. The women of these families traditionally were expert players of the gendér, an instrument which has a particularly important role in accompanying wayang performances. The sons of dalangs were often apprenticed out around the age of 13 to another dhalang. His role included helping to set up the screen ahead of a performance, performing the afternoon show before a main all-night wayang, and sometimes acting as an accompanying musician or as an assistant puppeteer. He would also frequently end up marrying his master's daughter, who would have been trained as a gendér player by her mother. The social aspects of the dalang caste are covered by Victoria Clara van Groenendael's book The Dalang Behind the Wayang (Dordrecht, 1985).

Much of the traditional training of dhalangs was in the form of a practical apprenticeship, with a certain amount of spiritual training thrown in. This included meditation and a form of ascetic exercise known as kungkum, in which meditation is carried out naked at night while immersed up to the neck in water. Such practices are felt to be essential in building up the stamina to perform for nine hours at a stretch. A further ascetic element is that dhalangs never eat during the performance, although almost all drink sweet tea and many also smoke heavily.

In recent times, however, schools teaching a standardized version of pedhalangan have been founded, such as the Habirandha school within the Kraton Yogyakarta. The Habirandha school published its own textbook, the Pedhalangan Ngayogyakarta, in 1976. Standardized pedhalangan is also taught at Indonesian state institutions such as the Indonesian Institute of the Arts, Yogyakarta.

Pedhalangan falls into three main areas - musical, vocal and puppetry. The musical aspects include the direction and cueing of the gamelan and the singing of mood-setting songs (sulukan), the vocal includes the recitation of set texts at scene-openings (kandha) and the extemporisation of dialogue showing mastery of Javanese linguistic etiquette, while the puppetry itself (sabetan) involves a complex system of movements and positions. There is an extensive study of sabetan in English by Roger Long (see Further reading).

See also

 Wayang
 Wayang kulit
 Sulukan
 Javanese culture

Further reading

Clara van Groenendael, Victoria (1985). The Dalang Behind the Wayang. Dordrecht, Foris.
Ghulam-Sarwar Yousof (1994). Dictionary of Traditional Southeast Asian Theatre. Oxford University Press. 
Keeler, Ward (1987). Javanese Shadow Plays, Javanese Selves. Princeton University Press.
Keeler, Ward (1992). Javanese Shadow Puppets. OUP.
Long, Roger (1982). Javanese shadow theatre: Movement and characterization in Ngayogyakarta wayang kulit. Umi Research Press.
Mudjanattistomo (1977). Pedhalangan Ngayogyakarta. Yogyakarta, Yayasan Habirandha (Habirandha Foundation).

External links
NIU page on the dalang
Joglosemar wayang page

Gamelan
Wayang